Christian Chelman is a Belgian magician born in 1957. He specializes in close-up magic, card magic, mentalism, bizarre magic, storytelling magic and fantastic illusionism.

In November 2012, as guest lecturer, he was bestowed an honorary lifetime member of PSYCRETS British Society of Mystery Entertainers at their Tabula Mentis XIII event.

References

1957 births
Belgian magicians
Living people